The Grotta del Cavallone, also known as the Grotta della Figlia di Jorio, is a cave located near Lama dei Peligni, in the province of Chieti, Abruzzo, Italy. It is open during the warmer months; an admission fee is charged.

Overview
The cave lies within the mountains of the Majella National Park, and is accessed via cable car. The cave is 10–20 meters wide and nearly the same height throughout, with numerous speleothems including stalagmites, flowstone, and rimstone pools. It has electric lighting with rough paths, concrete steps, and iron bridges.

Gabriele D'Annunzio employed the cave in the first act of his tragedy "La figlia di Iorio".

Gallery

See also
List of caves
List of caves in Italy

References 

 Showcaves description
 Grotta del Cavallone (on Lama dei Peligni website)
 Grotta del Cavallone (on abruzzoverdeblu.itt)

External links

 Grotta del Cavallone official website

Cavallone
Landforms of Abruzzo
Cavallone
Cavallone
Tourist attractions in Abruzzo